The Hardy Boys is an American animated series, produced by Filmation and aired Saturday mornings on ABC in 1969. It features the Hardy Boys, Joe and Frank, along with their friends Chubby Morton, Wanda Kay Breckenridge, and Pete Jones (one of the first black characters to appear on Saturday morning television) touring as a rock band while solving mysteries. The series is also notable for its opening and closing credits, in which the Hardys appeared in live action. The series debuted at the same time as Hanna-Barbera's similarly themed Scooby-Doo, Where Are You!, which aired on CBS. The series is noteworthy for including the producers' rotating wheel for the first time, which would make Filmation a household name.

Voices
 Byron Kane – Joe Hardy, Fenton Hardy
 Dallas McKennon – Frank Hardy, Chubby Morton, Pete Jones
 Jane Webb – Wanda Kay Breckenridge, Gertrude Hardy

Production and broadcast
Two 12-minute mysteries, based on the original book stories, made up one 24-minute television show. The 1969–1970 episodes were repeated for a second year in 1970–1971. Two live action songs were inserted in the middle of the mysteries and also used for the main and end titles, performed by a group calling themselves "The Hardy Boys". These songs were sold at stores on records and audio tapes under the album titles ‘’Here Come The Hardy Boys’’ (Billboard #199) and ‘’Wheels’’.  Both albums have since been released on streaming platforms in 2011 & 2021, respectively, by Sony Music.

As of March 2021, ownership of the rights to the series is currently unknown. The last known rights holder (for broadcast distribution only) was 20th Century Fox in the 1980s. However, in the 1970s and 1980s most of its episodes were released on 16mm film, which have been uploaded by numerous users to YouTube.

Episodes

References

External links
 
 

American Broadcasting Company original programming
1960s American animated television series
1970s American animated television series
1969 American television series debuts
1971 American television series endings
American children's animated musical television series
American children's animated mystery television series
American television series with live action and animation
Animated musical groups
English-language television shows
Television shows based on The Hardy Boys
Television series by Filmation
Television series by Universal Television
Television shows directed by Hal Sutherland